Byelorussia may refer to:

 Belarus, a country in Eastern Europe
 Byelorussian Soviet Socialist Republic (1920–1991), a Soviet republic in the territory of Belarus
 Socialist Soviet Republic of Byelorussia (1919), a short-lived republic in the territory of Belarus
 2170 Byelorussia, a main-belt asteroid

See also
Belarus (disambiguation)